The Nuttall Baronetcy, of Chasefield in the Parish of Bowdon in the County of Chester, is a title in the Baronetage of the United Kingdom. It was created on 22 June 1922 for Edmund Nuttall. He was head of Edmund Nuttall Limited, civil engineering contractors, of Manchester.

Nuttall baronets, of Chasefield (1922)
 Sir Edmund Nuttall, 1st Baronet (1870–1923)
 Sir (Edmund) Keith Nuttall, 2nd Baronet (1901 – 31 August 1941), killed in the Second World War whilst serving as a Lieutenant Colonel with the Royal Engineers, and succeeded by his only son, then eight years old.
 Sir Nicholas Keith Lillington Nuttall, 3rd Baronet (22 September 1933 – 29 July 2007), environmentalist who resided since 1979 in the Bahamas, and was married four times.
 Sir Harry Nuttall (born 1963) who is twice married.

Notes

References
 Kidd, Charles, Williamson, David (editors). Debrett's Peerage and Baronetage (1990 edition). New York: St Martin's Press, 1990.

External links
 Sir Keith Nuttall, 2nd Baronet, at the National Portrait Gallery

Nuttall
Nuttall family